Huimilpan (municipality) is a municipality in Querétaro in central Mexico.

Populated places in Huimilpan include Apapátaro.

References

Municipalities of Querétaro